Khalid Yousef Ozair (Arabic:خالد يوسف عزير) (born 21 April 1993) is an Emirati footballer who plays as a forward.

Career
Khalid Yousef started his career at Al Shabab and is a product of the Al-Shabab's youth system. and after hem played for Dibba Al-Fujairah. and Al Urooba.

External links

References

1993 births
Living people
Emirati footballers
Al Shabab Al Arabi Club Dubai players
Dibba FC players
Al Urooba Club players
UAE Pro League players
UAE First Division League players
Association football forwards
Place of birth missing (living people)